A police escort, also known as a law enforcement escort, is a service offered by police and law enforcement to assist in transporting important individuals or resources.

This is done by means of assigning police vehicles, primarily cars or motorcycles, to precede, surround, and/or follow a vehicle, or group of vehicles. Other government departments also provide escort services, such as secret service and military police.
An escort can range widely in size, beginning with a single vehicle. They almost always assist with motorcades for the transportation of senior public officials, such as heads of state or heads of government, or can be hired by celebrities, professional athletes, funerals.A police escort does not need to be side by side to those being escorted, nor does it have to be conducted using vehicles; any form of visible police protection for an important person or resource is considered a police escort. The purpose of the police escort is to ensure those who are being escorted get to their destination in a safe manner.

See also 

 Motorcade

Footnotes

Law enforcement
Escorts Near Main Road